The following are the national records in athletics for the Soviet Union. These records were maintained by the Soviet Athletics Federation during the country's existence until its dissolution in 1991. The Soviet Union coincided with a successful period in athletics for the region, resulting in many national records being world and European records as well. Athletes from any of the Republics of the Soviet Union were eligible for national records. Many of the records have not been improved upon since by athletes from the post-Soviet states.

Outdoor

Men

Women 

 + = the result is shown en route to a longer distance
X = unratified records

References

External links
 ARAF web site

Soviet Union
Records
Athletics